Java Excel API (a.k.a. JXL API) allows users to read, write, create, and modify sheets in an Excel (.xls) workbook at runtime. It doesn't support .xlsx format.

Microsoft Excel support
Java Excel API supports Excel documents with versions Excel 95, 97, 2000, XP, and 2003. These documents hold the extension .xls.

Usage
Java Excel API is widely used with Selenium.

Example
Sample code to write to an Excel file might look like as follows:
import java.io.File;
import jxl.Workbook;
import jxl.write.WritableSheet;
import jxl.write.WritableWorkbook;
import jxl.write.Label;
import jxl.write.WriteException;

public class DataSheet
{
    private Workbook wbook;
    private WritableWorkbook wwbCopy;
    private WritableSheet shSheet;

    public void readExcel()
    {
        try
        {
            wbook = Workbook.getWorkbook(new File("path/testSampleData.xls"));
            wwbCopy = Workbook.createWorkbook(new File("path/testSampleDataCopy.xls"), wbook);
            shSheet = wwbCopy.getSheet(0);
        }
        catch (Exception e)
        {
            e.printStackTrace();
        }
    }
   
    public void setValueIntoCell(String strSheetName, int iColumnNumber, int iRowNumber, String strData) throws WriteException
    {
        WritableSheet wshTemp = wwbCopy.getSheet(strSheetName);
        Label labTemp = new Label(iColumnNumber, iRowNumber, strData);
               
        try 
        {
            wshTemp.addCell(labTemp);
        }
        catch (Exception e)
        {
            e.printStackTrace();
        }
    }
   
    public void closeFile()
    {
        try 
        {
            // Closing the writable work book
            wwbCopy.write();
            wwbCopy.close();

            // Closing the original work book
            wbook.close();
        }
        catch (Exception e)
        {
            e.printStackTrace();
        }
    }
   
    public static void main(String[] args) throws WriteException
    {
        DataSheet ds = new DataSheet();
        ds.readExcel();
        ds.setValueIntoCell("sheet1", 5, 1, "PASS");
        ds.setValueIntoCell("sheet1", 5, 2, "FAIL");
        ds.setValueIntoCell("sheet1", 5, 3, "PASS");
        ds.closeFile();
    }
}

See also
Apache POI
Open Packaging Conventions
Office Open XML software

References

External links
 
 
  - MAVEN repository

Microsoft Office-related software
Java platform
Java (programming language) libraries
Cross-platform free software